A special election was held in  on September 6, 1808 to fill a vacancy caused by the resignation of James Witherell (DR) on May 1 of the same year, to accept a position as judge of the Supreme Court of Michigan Territory.

Election results

Shaw took his seat on November 8, 1808

See also
 United States House of Representatives elections in Vermont, 1808
 United States House of Representatives elections, 1808 and 1809
 List of special elections to the United States House of Representatives

References

Vermont 01
Vermont 1808 01
1808 01 Special
Vermont 01 Special
United States House of Representatives 01
United States House of Representatives 1808 01